Galleonosaurus (meaning "galleon lizard" as the upper jaw bone resembles an upturned galleon) is a genus of basal ornithopod dinosaur from the Wonthaggi Formation of the Gippsland region of Victoria, Australia. The type and only species is Galleonosaurus dorisae.

Discovery and naming 

The original specimen that would form the basis for Galleonosaurus was discovered at the Flat Rocks locality of the Wonthaggi Formation in 2008 by palaeontologist Gerry Kool. This was the same site that the related Qantassaurus, named twenty years earlier in 1999, had been found. Flat Rocks is thought to have been deposited 125 million years ago in the late Barremian age of the Cretaceous, and is today located near Inverloch, Victoria within the Bunurong Marine National Park, on a shoreline rock platform. During the Cretaceous, the area would've been at a far higher latitude, within the Antarctic Circle. After discovery, specimen was catalogued at the Melbourne Museum and studied by Matthew C. Herne. He and colleagues would go on to name the specimen as Galleonosaurus dorisae in 2019, in a paper published in the Journal of Paleontology. It is the fifth named ornithopod from Victoria, following Atlascopcosaurus, Leaellynasaura, Qantassaurus, and Diluvicursor.

The generic name is derived from "galleon" (a type of large sailing ship) and "saurus" (New Latin from the Greek sauros for lizard), in reference to the appearance of the maxilla to the upturned hull of a galleon. The specific name dorisae was given in recognition of Doris Seegets-Villiers for her geological, palynological, and taphonomic work on the Flat Rocks fossil vertebrate locality. The holotype specimen is NMV P229196, a complete left maxilla with partial dentition. In addition to this specimeen, several other specimens from Flat Rocks were referred to Galleonosaurus. These include: NMV P212845, a partial left maxilla lacking erupted dentition; NMV P208178, a partial left maxilla with erupted dentition; NMV P208113, a worn right maxillary tooth; NMV P208523, worn left maxillary tooth; and NMV P209977, partial left maxilla, lacking erupted dentition. In addition, the specimen NMV P186440, collected from the nearby locality The Caves, was referred to the taxon. It consists of a posterior portion of left maxilla, left palatine, and fragment of left lacrimal.

Description 

Galleonosaurus would've been a small, bipedal animal. It is characterized by five potential autapomorphies: ascending ramus of the  has two slot-like  on the anterior (front) margin that communicate with the neurovascular tract; neurovascular tract bifurcates internally to exit at two anteroventral (front, on the bottom) maxillary foramina; lingual (inner) margin of maxillary tooth roots in midregion of tooth row form an S-bend at their bases; posterior third of maxilla on some, but not all, specimens deflects posterolaterally (backwards, to the side) at an abrupt kink; and lateral end of  lateral ramus forms a hatchet-shaped flange. Part of the  bone is known, but unlike the maxilla it is too fragmented to determine much of its anatomy.

Among the known specimens of Galleonosaurus, a small degree of variation has been observed. Some specimens including the holotype have fifteen alveoli, or tooth positions, whereas others have thirteen or fourteen, though show indications of small or developing ones. The teeth themselves also demonstrate some variation, though it is only minor. Additionally, an abrupt kink in the jawbone is present on some but all specimens; likewise, one specimen has a pyramid-shaped peak on the top edge, whereas the others are smooth and rounded in this area. The latter two traits do not differ along lines of age, and so it has been suggested it may represent evidence of subspecific variation in the species or sexual dimorphism. Neither hypothesis, however, can be clearly tested, leaving the nature of the morphological variation unclear.

Phylogeny 

To assess the phylogenetic position of Galleonosaurus, Herne et al. used a data matrix from a 2016 paper by Paul-Emile Dieudonné and colleagues. However, due to the fragmentary nature of the Victorian taxa of interest, they extensively revised the dataset so as to have heightened chances of good resolution in the results. Numerous characters (i.e. anatomical data points) were removed, altered, or added. The analysis found Galleonosaurus to be a member of the clade Elasmaria, being related to other Gondwanan ornithopods. This result was supported by the observation of multiple shared anatomical traits between the elasmarian taxa. The material proved too fragmentary, however, to resolve more precise relationships between these species, though dental similarities indicate a potential close relationship to Leaellynasaura and Atlascopcosaurus.

It has been noted to be possible that Galleonosaurus dorisae may be a synonym of Qantassaurus intrepidus rather than a distinct taxon, given they are known from non-overlapping remains and are from the same locality. However, dentaries from Flat Rocks have been discovered which different from that of Qantassaurus, having been termed Victoria Ornithopod Dentary morphotype 3, or VOD3; these confirm the presence of multiple small ornithopods in the ecosystem. Compared to the short dentary of Qantassaurus, the VOD3 dentaries are more elongated, and have more  positions, with thirteen as opposed to ten. Seeing as the Galleonosaurus maxillae have fifteen positions, and ornithopod dentaries and maxillae of the same species generally only differ in this number by up to two, it was considered unlikely that the Qantassaurus dentaries rather than the VOD3 ones belong to the same animal as Galleonosaurus. Despite this, no definite referral of the VOD3 material to Galleonosaurus could be made.

The cladogram below shows results from the analysis by Herne et al., 2019:

References 

Ornithopods
Barremian life
Early Cretaceous dinosaurs of Australia
Fossils of Australia
Fossil taxa described in 2019
Ornithischian genera